An Internationale Bauausstellung (IBA) or International Architecture Exhibition is a German device for urban engineering and architecture, in order to show new concepts in terms of social, cultural and ecologic ideas.

History 
 The first one dates to 1901 and was held in Darmstadt.
 In 1913, there was an IBA on the site of today`s Alte Messe in Leipzig. 
 IBA '57 was organised in Berlin.
 1979–87 IBA Berlin was an urban renewal project which followed the strategies of "careful urban renewal" and "critical reconstruction". The program inspired the formation of the group Feministische Organisation von Planerinnen und Architektinnen (Feminist Architects and Planners Organisation or FOPA), who objected to its failure to adequately address women-specific issues and involve female designers. 
 1989–99 IBA Emscher Park aimed at restructuring a former industrial region, the Ruhr, by sparking urbanistic, architectural, cultural, and economic incentives.

Current 
 2027 Stuttgart www.IBA27.de
 2012–20 IBA Parkstad is the first IBA to be held completely outside of Germany, in the former mining region of Parkstad Limburg in the Netherlands. Currently at least 39 projects have been chosen to develop further.

References

Further reading 
 Bärbel Rechenbach: „Vom Bergmann zum Seemann – Die Lausitz wandelt sich vom Tagebauland zur Kulturlandschaft.“ TIEFBAU 5/2007, S. 276–284
 „IBA HAMBURG - Entwürfe für die Zukunft der Metropole“, Band 1: „Metropole: Reflexion“, JOVIS Verlag, Berlin 2007, 
 „IBA HAMBURG - Entwürfe für die Zukunft der Metropole“, Band 2: „Metropole: Ressourcen“, JOVIS Verlag, Berlin 2008, 
 „IBA HAMBURG - Entwürfe für die Zukunft der Metropole“, Band 3: "Metropole: Bilden", JOVIS Verlag, Berlin 2009, 
 Sally Below, Moritz Henning, Heike Oevermann: Die Berliner Bauausstellungen – Wegweiser in die Zukunft? Regioverlag, Berlin 2009, 
 Zur Zukunft Internationaler Bauausstellungen, Netzwerk "IBA meets IBA", IBA Hamburg (Hg.), JOVIS Verlag 2010, 
 Karl Ganser: Liebe auf den zweiten Blick. Internationale Bauausstellung Emscher Park. Harenberg, Dortmund 1999,

External links 
 Research initiative IBA 87 in German
 A review on IBA specifications in French

Architecture festivals
Urban planning in Germany
Festivals in Germany